is a Japanese singer and actress. She was a member and the leader of Cute, a girl idol group within Hello! Project.

Career
Yajima first joined Hello! Project in 2002 as one of the fifteen children chosen from the Hello! Project Kids auditions after performing "Momoiro Kataomoi" by Aya Matsuura. She debuted the same year in the movie Koinu Dan no Monogatari, taking on one of the main roles as an antagonist. The following year, she joined the first of the kids' groups, ZYX, which released two singles.

In 2004, Berryz Kobo was formed, with the intention of rotating the girls throughout the unit. Yajima did not make the original pick, and the idea was eventually dropped. The remaining girls eventually ended up forming Cute in 2005. Despite not being the oldest, Yajima still became the group's leader, after Erika Umeda turned down the role. The group did not make its official debut until late in 2006, with their first official single released in February 2007.

Aside from leading Cute, Yajima became the sub-captain of Little Gatas and the Hello! Project Kids futsal team. She was also considered to be one of the fastest runners in all of Hello! Project, often coming first in the running events at the annual sports festivals and listing running as one of her hobbies.

Yajima also co-hosted Cute's weekly radio program, Cutie Party. She took over the role when Megumi Murakami left the group.

In 2008, Yajima was selected to be a member of Hello Project's new unit High-King. Yajima and Fukuda Kanon appeared in the movie Fuyu no Kaidan (Winter Ghost Story), released in Japan on May 23, 2009.

Cute disbanded following their final concert at Saitama Super Arena on June 12, 2017. Yajima had announced earlier, via the group's blog, that she planned to pursue an acting career.

Personal life 
Maimi's younger cousin, Akari Takeuchi, is a member of ANGERME, another girl group within Hello! Project.

On November 8, 2022, she announced her marriage with actor Ryosuke Mikata.

Discography

Solo DVDs

Duet singles

Bibliography

Photobooks

Appearances

Movies 
 
  (2009)
 Ōsama Game (December 17, 2011)
  (December 29, 2012)
 First Love (2019)
 BLACKFOX: Age of the Ninja (2019)

Straight-to-video 
  (April 27, 2011, Geneon Universal Entertainment) as Reira
  (July 4, 2012)
  (August 3, 2012)

TV dramas 
 Sūgaku Joshi Gakuen (January 11, 2012 – March 28, 2012)
  (2011)

 Television 
  (May 3, 2005)
 °C-ute Has Come #03 (December 2, 2006)
 °C-ute Has Come #04 (December 16, 2006)
 58th NHK Kōhaku Uta Gassen (December 31, 2007)
  (NHK Osaka, April 21, 2009)
  (June 26, 2009) — a talk show featuring Hello! Project members
 
 
 
 

 Radio 
 Cutie Party (November 4, 2006 – ongoing)
  (July 4, 2008 – ongoing, Fridays at 10 pm, FM Port)

 Internet 
 Hello! ga Ippai #01 (November 10, 2006)
 Hello! ga Ippai #02 (November 24, 2006)
 Hello! Pro Hour #02 (March 17, 2006)
  (2011)
 Hagiwara Mai Desu ga... Nani ka? (2012)

 Theater 
 Cat's Eye'' (2012) as Hitomi Kisugi
 Hatagumi Vol.3 "Ran" (2010) as Ran
 Hatagumi Vol.4 "Ran―2011New version!!" (2011) as Ran
 Hatagumi Vol.5 "Taklamakan" (2013) as Kei

References

External links 
 Cute official blog 
 Maimi Yajima's official UStream channel
 °C-ute: Official Hello! Project profile 
 FM Port Maimi Yajima Profile 

1992 births
Hello! Project Kids members
Japanese female idols
Japanese radio personalities
Living people
People from Saitama (city)
ZYX (pop group) members
Cute (Japanese idol group) members
Musicians from Saitama Prefecture
21st-century Japanese singers
21st-century Japanese actresses